KF Drenica, commonly known as Drenica is a professional football club based in Skënderaj, Kosovo. The club plays in the Football Superleague of Kosovo, which is the top tier of football in the country.

Players

Current squad

Personnel

Historical list of coaches

 Valdet Shoshi (2005 - 2007)
 Tahir Lushtaku ( - 3 Jun 2013)
 Fadil Rama (30 Jun 2013 - 18 Sep 2013)
 Afrim Jashari (19 Sep 2013 - 16 Mar 2014)
 Mehmet Mehmeti (18 Mar 2014 - Jun 2015)
 Fadil Rama (29 Jul 2015 - Sep 2015)
 Valdet Shoshi (16 Sep 2015 - 17 Mar 2016)
 Fadil Rama (18 Mar 2016 -Jun 2016)
 Afrim Jashari (Jul 2016 - 25 Nov 2016)
 Bekim Shotani (17 Jun 2017 - Dec 2017)
 Sadat Pajaziti (4 Jan 2018 - Jun 2018)
 Tahir Lushtaku (Jul 2018 - Dec 2019)
 Gani Sejdiu (3 Jan 2020 -)

Bledar Devolli, trajner i ri i  Bledar Devolli (3 Jan 2020 -)<ref>

References

External links
KF Drenica at Soccerway

1958 establishments in Yugoslavia
Association football clubs established in 1958
Football clubs in Yugoslavia
Football clubs in Kosovo